John Robinson Lim Gokongwei Jr. (11 August 1926 – 9 November 2019) was a Filipino businessman, investor, and philanthropist. His conglomerate company JG Summit Holdings, Inc., had an extensive panoply of business and investment holdings across the Filipino economy, including shipping, telecommunications, retail, financial services, petrochemicals, utilities, aviation, food, beverages, and livestock farming.

Early life
Gokongwei was born in China to John Gokongwei Sr. and Juanita Márquez Lim. His father was a scion of a wealthy Cebu-based family with ancestral ties to China's Southern Fujian province. His great-grandfather (1859–1921), a young peddler from China, was Hispanized as Pedro Singson Gotiaoco () and became one of the Philippines' most prominent Chinese Filipinos.

Gokongwei attended the basic education department of University of San Carlos for primary school (graduating valedictorian) and high school.

The family fortune was lost after the death of his father in 1939 when Gokongwei was 13 years old and World War II (1939–1945) was just starting. During these difficult years, he initially supported his family by peddling items along the streets of Cebu from his bicycle. From the years 1943 to 1945, or between the ages of 17 and 19, he traded using a wooden boat, taking his goods to Dalahican, Lucena by sea and then to Manila by truck.

Business career

After World War II, he started his own company called Amasia Trading, which imported flour, onions, fruits, used clothing, old newspapers, and magazines from the United States.

In the early 1950s, along with his brothers and sisters who returned from China, he started to import cigarettes and whiskey too. By 1957, seeing that trading would always have low margins and would always be dependent on government policies, the family concern shifted towards manufacturing. With a loan of 500 thousand pesos from Albino Sycip, then chairman of China Bank, and Dee K. Chiong, he started a corn milling plant producing glucose and corn starch. The company was named Universal Corn Products (which later evolved into Universal Robina Corporation). San Miguel Corporation was a big customer of theirs.

In 1961, he established Consolidated Food Corporation (later known as CFC Corporation, which later merged with Universal Robina Corporation), which launched its instant coffee brand Blend 45.

In 1977, Gokongwei earned his Master of Business Administration from De La Salle University. A decade later, he attended a 14-week advanced management program at Harvard University.

In November 1990, Gokongwei incorporated JG Summit Holdings as a publicly listed holding company. In March 1996, Cebu Pacific Air began operations. In 2010, the airline underwent major refleeting with a $3 billion order with Airbus. From 2003, his telecom company Digital Telecommunications Philippines spent nearly $800 million for its mobile carrier, Sun Cellular, which was the third-largest mobile operator in the Philippines at that time before selling to the PLDT group for $1.7 billion. He attempted a $1 billion takeover of United Industrial Corporation Ltd (UIC), a property giant from Singapore of which he owned in excess of 30%. UIC controls Singapore Land, one of the biggest property landlords in Singapore.

In 2013, his company bought the stake of San Miguel Corporation in Meralco, the largest power distributor in the country, for close to $1.8 billion. In July 2014, Universal Robina acquired Griffin's Foods from Pacific Equity Partners, a New Zealand food company for $609 million.

He also owned Robinsons Retail Holdings, Inc. and Robinsons Land Corporation.

The Gokongwei family controls over $20 billion of combined market capitalization for all the companies they own.

In February 2008, Forbes Asia magazine's first Heroes of Philanthropy list included four Filipinos – Gokongwei, Jaime Zobel de Ayala, Ramón del Rosario Jr. and Oscar López. The list was composed of four philanthropists each from 13 selected countries and territories in Asia.

Publications
On 29 August 2007, at the Ateneo de Manila University, Gokongwei's biography, John L. Gokongwei Jr.: The Path of Entrepreneurship, by the university's Dr. Marites A. Khanser, was launched, and it narrated the "riches-to-rags-to-riches" story of the tai-pan. Gokongwei stated that entrepreneurship is a way out of poverty. Khanser's book also enumerated the Nine Rules of business success that Gokongwei followed since he was still a young businessman. In 2002 Gokongwei donated P200-million to the undergraduate school of management. He also gave donations to University of San Carlos, Xavier School, De La Salle University, Sacred Heart School – Ateneo de Cebu and Immaculate Conception Academy (ICA).

Personal life
Gokongwei married Elizabeth Yu in 1958 and had six children (one son and five daughters) – Lisa, Robina, Lance, Faith, Hope and Marcia. All his children play an active role in the Gokongwei group. His eldest daughter, Robina, heads the operations of Robinsons Retail Holdings, Inc. (she owns Robinsons Malls), as the company's COO since 2002. His only son, Lance, currently leads the group as president and CEO of JG Summit.

He was a second cousin once removed of Andrew Gotianun Sr., the founder of Filinvest Development Corporation. Gokongwei's great-grandfather was a half brother of Gotianun's grandfather. He is also second cousins with the Gaisano family, with Doña Modesta Singson-Gaisano being his grandaunt (his grandfather's sister) which he used to call in Hokkien , under his great-grandfather, Don Pedro Singson Gotiaoco, whose illegitimate son was also President Sergio Osmeña.

Death 
Gokongwei died in Manila on 9 November 2019, at the age of 93. Exactly one week after his death, his widow Elizabeth Yu Gokongwei died at the age of 85.

See also
Universal Robina
JG Summit Holdings
Robinsons Retail
Emilio Yap

References

External links
 Lessons on Entrepreneurship from John Gokongwei's Life
 John Gokongwei Speech to the 20th AD Congress

1926 births
2019 deaths
Ateneo de Manila University alumni
Businesspeople from Cebu
Businesspeople in aviation
Businesspeople in retailing
Businesspeople in shipping
Businesspeople in telecommunications
Businesspeople in the food industry
De La Salle University alumni
Filipino bankers
Filipino billionaires
Filipino businesspeople in real estate
Filipino company founders
Filipino investors
Filipino people of Chinese descent
JG Summit Holdings